Zaks are a construction toy.

Zaks may also refer to:
Zaks (surname)
Zak's, a bus company in England

See also
Zacks
Sachs
Sachse (disambiguation)
Sacks (surname)
Saks (disambiguation)
Sax (disambiguation)
Saxe (disambiguation)
Small-angle X-ray scattering (SAXS)
Zax (disambiguation)